Desert flower may refer to:

 The Desert Flower, an 1863 opera by William Vincent Wallace
 Desert Flower, a 1998 biography of Somali model Waris Dirie
 Desert Flower (film), a 2009 German film adaptation of the biography
 The Desert Flower (film), a 1925 American Western film
 Desert Flower, a Native American hound character in the 1988 animated film The Good, the Bad, and Huckleberry Hound